Tamalpais may refer to:
Tamalpais, California, former name of Kentfield, California
Tamalpais, California, former name of Tamalpais Valley, California
Mount Tamalpais
Tamalpais High School
Tamalpais-Homestead Valley, California
Tamalpais Union High School District
Mount Tamalpais State Park
USS Tamalpais (AO-96)

See also
Tamaulipas